Pooler is a city in Chatham County, Georgia, United States. According to the official 2020 U.S. Census, the population was 25,711, up 34.3% from the 2010 population of 19,140. Pooler is located northwest of Savannah along Interstates 95 and 16. It comprises part of the Savannah metropolitan area.

History
The city was named for railroad employee Robert William Pooler.

During the Civil War, Pooler was a railway stop called Pooler's Station—the last stop before Savannah on the Central of Georgia Railway. In December 1864, Pooler was a meeting place for Union officers led by William Tecumseh Sherman, who negotiated with Savannah authorities for the strategic port city's peaceful surrender.

Geography 

It is bordered by Port Wentworth to the north, Garden City to the east, a far-flung portion of Savannah to the north/northeast (Airport) and the southwest, and Bloomingdale to the west.

Demographics

2020 census

As of the 2020 United States census, there were 25,711 people, 8,794 households, and 6,130 families residing in the city.

In the 2010 census, the racial makeup of the city was 65.4% White, 25.4% African American, 0.2% Native American, 3.8% Asian, 0.1% Pacific Islander, 2.2% from other races, and 2.9% from two or more races. Hispanic or Latino of any race were 6.6% of the population.

There were 7,300 households, out of which 35.6% had children under the age of 18 living with them, 56.1% were married couples living together, 11.4% had a female householder with no husband present, and 29.0% were non-families. 22.5% of all households were made up of individuals, and 4.1% had someone living alone who was 65 years of age or older. The average household size was 2.61 and the average family size was 3.09.

In the city, the population was spread out, with 26.2% under the age of 18, 8.1% from 18 to 24, 34.9% from 25 to 44, 23.2% from 45 to 64, and 7.6% who were 65 years of age or older. The median age was 33.2 years. For every 100 females, there were 97.3 males.

The median income for a household in the city was $71,737, and the median income for a family was $78,419. Males had a median income of $53,854 versus $38,401 for females. The per capita income for the city was $30,336. About 5.4% of families and 6.4% of the population were below the poverty line, including 8.4% of those between ages 18 and 15. 26.1% of those age 65 or over.

Economy
Pooler is the center for commercial development in west Chatham County. Godley Station, the center for business development, has been successful in attracting large companies such as construction equipment manufacturer JCB to the area. It is home to the headquarters of tactical gear manufacturer Blue Force Gear. Private jet manufacturer Gulfstream Aerospace is located right outside the city limits. It is one of the largest manufacturers of private jets in the United States and provides one of the largest employment numbers in the Savannah and Pooler area. Newer shopping centers such as The Shops at Godley Station are bringing new revenue to the area. Low crime LINK and a small-town community atmosphere have all been factors in its explosive growth. Pooler is now one of Georgia's fastest-growing cities.

Notable people
 Jared Wade, country music singer-songwriter
 Buddy Carter, U.S. representative for 1st district of Georgia

See also
 Mighty Eighth Air Force Museum

References

External links

City of Pooler official website

Cities in Georgia (U.S. state)
Cities in Chatham County, Georgia
Savannah metropolitan area